Too Many Girls is a Broadway musical comedy which was adapted for a 1940 film version starring Lucille Ball. The original Broadway production is noteworthy for advancing the career of musician Desi Arnaz. The music was composed by Richard Rodgers, the lyrics by Lorenz Hart, and the book was by George Marion, Jr.

Broadway
Too Many Girls opened on Broadway on October 18, 1939, at the Imperial Theatre, running to April 21, 1940, and transferred to the Broadway Theatre on April 22, 1940, closing on May 18, 1940. The cast featured Desi Arnaz, Diosa Costello, Marcy Westcott, Eddie Bracken, Richard Kollmar, Van Johnson, and Hal Le Roy. Directed by George Abbott, the Musical Staging was by Robert Alton, scenery by Jo Mielziner, and costumes by Raoul Pène Du Bois.

The musical takes place in Skowhegan, Maine and Pottawatomie College in Stop Gap, New Mexico.

Film

Arnaz and Bracken repeated their roles in the 1940 RKO Radio Pictures film version. The film cast also featured Lucille Ball, Richard Carlson, Ann Miller, and Van Johnson

Songs 
Act I
 "Heroes in the Fall" - Second Robin Hood and Squad
 "Tempt Me Not" - Manuelito, Clint Kelley, First Co-Ed, Second Co-Ed, Third Co-Ed, Fourth Co-Ed, Fifth Co-Ed and Sixth Co-Ed
 "My Prince" - Consuelo Casey
 "Pottawattamie" - Harvey Casey and Mr. Lister
 "Pottawattamie" (Reprise) - Male Quartette and Ensemble
 "'Cause We Got Cake" - Eileen Eilers
 "Love Never Went to College" - Consuelo Casey and Clint Kelley
 "Spic and Spanish" - Pepe
 "I Like to Recognize the Tune" - Jojo Jordan, Consuelo Casey, Eileen Eilers, Clint Kelley and Al Terwillinger
 "Look Out" - Eileen Eilers and Company

Act II
 "The Sweethearts of the Team" - Eileen Eilers and Co-Eds
 "She Could Shake the Maracas" - Pepe and Manuelito
 "I Didn't Know What Time It Was" - Consuelo Casey and Clint Kelley
 "Spic and Spanish" (Reprise) - Pepe, Consuelo Casey, Eileen Eilers, Al Terwillinger, Clint Kelley, Jojo Jordan, Manuelito and Talullah Lou
 "Too Many Girls" - Manuelito
 "Give it Back to the Indians" - Eileen Eilers

Recording
An LP studio recording was released in 1977, produced by Ben Bagley on the Painted Smiles label and featuring Estelle Parsons and Anthony Perkins.

References

External links

Overview of show
Photo of Broadway advertisement, 1940's (click "start exploring")

1939 musicals
Broadway musicals
Musicals by Rodgers and Hart